Ken Dilanian   is an American journalist. Presently, he is based in Washington, DC serving as the justice and intelligence correspondent for NBC News.

Early life and education
Dilanian was born in Intercourse, PA. Dilanian is a 1991 graduate of Williams College.

Career
Dilanian worked  three years at USA Today, where he covered foreign policy and Congress. 
He was a reporter in the Los Angeles Times’ Washington, D.C., bureau from April 2010 until May 2014.  As a Rome-based foreign correspondent, he made frequent trips to Iraq.

CIA collaboration 
Dilanian routinely submitted drafts of his stories to the Central Intelligence Agency for approval, according to CIA documents.

Awards and honors
Dilanian won the 2007 Casey Medal for Meretricious Journalism.

References

Living people
NBC News people
Williams College alumni
People from Massachusetts
Year of birth missing (living people)